Mark Funkhouser (born October 4, 1949) is an American academic, author, and politician who served as the 53rd mayor of Kansas City, Missouri, serving one four-year term from May 1, 2007, until May 2, 2011. Prior to serving as the city's mayor, Funkhouser served as Kansas City's city auditor. Currently, he serves as the publisher of Governing magazine. He is also the author of the blog, "Bring on the Funk, and the book, Honest, Competent Government: The Promise of Performance Auditing. In 2016, Funkhouser was elected as a fellow of the National Academy of Public Administration.

Early life and education
Born and raised in Paden City, West Virginia, Funkhouser graduated from Paden City High School. He earned his B.A. in political science from Thiel College, his M.A. in business administration from Tennessee State University, M.A. in social work from West Virginia University and his Ph.D. from the University of Missouri–Kansas City.

Early career
Funkhouser was the founding editor of the Local Government Auditing Quarterly and served in that capacity for ten years. He has taught at Salem College, Salem, West Virginia, Park University, University of Missouri-Kansas City and University of Kansas. He was the Director of State Audit in Nashville, Tennessee, from 1978-1988, leaving that post to become the Kansas City Auditor in 1988, and relinquishing that post in 2006 to run for mayor.

2007 mayoral race

Announcing his candidacy for mayor of Kansas City, Missouri in late 2006, Funkhouser was endorsed early by the Kansas City Star and emerged as one of two candidates following the February mayoral primary fielding 13 candidates. Funkhouser won the mayoral election on March 27, 2007.

Funkhouser's campaign motto was "A city that works for regular folks." He had campaigned on a promise to pay more attention to neighborhoods and to end corrupt TIF deals with special-interest developers. During his mayoral campaign in 2007, he became known by the citizens of Kansas City by his nickname, "The Funk".

Funkhouser's wife, Gloria Squitiro, ran his campaign. Funkhouser wore an orange tie in reference to the Ukrainian Orange Revolution and as a symbol of his desire for change. From his campaign website: "I've chosen orange as my official campaign color because it is fast becoming a symbol for change in politics – a shift away from back-room deal making and toward an open style of governance that respects and listens to citizens." Funkhouser was also critical of project spending during the Kay Barnes administration. In a KCTV interview he said, "We've been buying stuff," he said. "What we don't know is whether what we bought is what is worth what we paid for it."

Controversies

Free automobile
Implementation of Funkhouser's campaign pledges of fiscal conservatism while cleaning up local government received national headlines early in his administration when Funkhouser announced his intention to accept a new leased Honda Civic Hybrid from a Northland auto dealer. The city's law department approved the offer, which would have been reported to the Missouri Ethics Commission. Funkhouser believed that by being transparent about the transaction, he could avoid any appearance of impropriety and save the city $160,000 a year by rejecting the city-owned car, with its attendant driver and police security detail. However, critics questioned the "gift." City Councilman John Sharp said "It sure doesn't pass the smell test...It's nice that the mayor is providing so much free publicity to a foreign auto company." Funkhouser eventually rejected the hybrid, choosing instead to drive his privately owned vehicle himself.

Minutemen controversy
Funkhouser became embroiled in another controversy when it was discovered his appointed co-commissioner for the Parks and Recreation Board Frances Semler was a member of the Minuteman Civil Defense Corps. Critics insisted that Semler resign the board or the Minutemen. This controversy attracted national attention, prompting two national civil rights organizations (La Raza and the NAACP) to withdraw their conventions from Kansas City in protest of Funkhouser's refusal to ask for Semler's resignation from an organization they call a "hate group."

Funkhouser's supporters say Funkhouser believes that "diversity" encompasses not only skin color but also opinion, and they point to another commissioner, Ajamu Webster, who founded the local National Black United Front (NBUF), an organization advocating reparations and separatist education for blacks. They note that the Southern Rights Coalition doesn't consider the Minutemen a "hate group." They also claim Semler's personal views on immigration are not germane to her professional service as a parks commissioner.

Gloria Squitiro
An ongoing controversy during Funkhouser's term as mayor involved his wife's carrying out the normal duties of First Lady, a strictly volunteer position. Revered during the campaign for her honest newsletters, "Notes From the DoubleWide," upon his election, Funkhouser's wife, a small business owner and doula, took a desk near his office within City Hall, and brought that personal glimpse into his office.

Funkhouser had stated that he and his wife were a "political team." He asserts that it was squarely within his authority to have anyone on a volunteer basis, further citing that Squitiro was his advisor during the election.

Critics said her participation in her husband's administration is a clear violation of the Missouri Constitution's "Nepotism Clause" . The City Council passed an ordinance (the only nay vote being Funkhouser's) on the pretense of banning certain types of volunteers from serving at City Hall, but the only one it effectively barred was Squitiro from the premises. In response, Funkhouser began holding meetings in which she was needed in public libraries. Funkhouser filed suit against the city, claiming the "volunteer ordinance" unconstitutional. The court ruled in Funkhouser's favor and the ordinance was repealed

Personal life
An avid chess player, Funkhouser celebrated his election night party at the Westport Flea Market, a neighborhood tavern where he regularly met with the Westport Chess Club to play. He is also a professional speaker.

References

External links
Official website 
 "Bring on the Funk" 

1949 births
Living people
Mayors of Kansas City, Missouri
Missouri Democrats
Paden City High School alumni
People from Paden City, West Virginia
Tennessee State University alumni
Thiel College alumni
University of Kansas faculty
University of Missouri–Kansas City alumni
University of Missouri–Kansas City faculty
West Virginia University alumni